Little River–Windom USD 444 is a public unified school district headquartered in Little River, Kansas, United States.  The district includes the communities of Little River, Windom, and nearby rural areas.

Schools
The school district operates the following schools:
 Little River High School
 Windom Elementary School

See also
 Kansas State Department of Education
 Kansas State High School Activities Association
 List of high schools in Kansas
 List of unified school districts in Kansas

References

External links
 

School districts in Kansas
Education in Rice County, Kansas